U-FLY Alliance is a regional airline alliance based in the Chinese Special Administrative Region of Hong Kong, and made up of low-cost airlines from Hong Kong, Mainland China, and South Korea. Upon founding, it became the world's first alliance of low-cost carriers, formed in January 2016 between founding members HK Express, Urumqi Air, and West Air. All four founding airlines except HK Express are affiliated with the HNA Group, with a focus on Hong Kong, mainland China, and Southeast Asia, but they are currently seeking new members which are not affiliated with HNA Group. Eastar Jet, a South Korean low-cost carrier, joined the alliance on 27 July 2016. The main founder HK Express withdrew from U-FLY Alliance after becoming a wholly-owned low-cost subsidiary of Cathay Pacific, a Oneworld member, and the alliance became inactive(The official website is invalid).

History 
The alliance was formed for various reasons. Since China’s provinces vary in what they allow and don’t allow for airlines it is difficult for two or more airlines from different regions to merge. The alliance was formed to help smaller airlines grow larger without becoming one company in several different provinces. Another motivator for creating an alliance instead of merging is that the regions preferred to have a local airline with a local identity that can advocate for the area it is in. U-FLY Alliance was announced on 18 January 2016 at a press conference in Hong Kong. The founding members were all part of HNA Group, a Chinese conglomerate, until HK Express was acquired by Cathay Pacific in 2019. However, the alliance bears no outward affiliation with the group and it is open to airlines outside of it.

In 2017, U-FLY Alliance partner’s capacity included over 44 million seats, touching 18 countries, 149 airports and 339 city pairs. With over 129 aircraft currently in operation. By 2020, the alliance's members hope to have a fleet of over 218 aircraft. Of the 218 aircraft Lucky Air hopes to grow to 60 aircraft, West Air to 60, HK Express to 50, and Urumqi Air to 48.

Member airlines

Current members 
, the following airlines are members of U-FLY Alliance:

Former members

References

External links 

 

 
Airline alliances
Organizations established in 2016